The 2014 season is Santos Futebol Clube's 102nd season in existence and the club's fifty-fifth consecutive season in the top flight of Brazilian football. As well as the Campeonato Brasileiro, the club competes in the Copa do Brasil and the Campeonato Paulista. This season is the first in history that Santos uses fixed numbers assigned to each player.

On 19 December 2013, Santos signed Leandro Damião from Internacional for a fee of R$ 42 million (€13m) (biggest transfer in history between two Brazilian clubs). At the same time, the club did not spend a cent, as the player's rights were bought by Doyen Sports, an investment fund based in Malta; Damião was later assigned to Peixe in a free transfer, but the club will have to pay the company after the end of Damião's contract, with a 10% interest per year.

This was Oswaldo de Oliveira's second (third in history) season in charge after Claudinei Oliveira was relieved from the club at the end of the 2013 season. He was relieved from his duties on 2 September, after a bad run of results. A day after Oswaldo's dismissal, Santos appointed Enderson Moreira as the club's new manager.

Santos reached Campeonato Paulista's finals for the sixth successive year, but lost to countryside team Ituano in penalties after a 1–1 draw on aggregate score.

On 15 May, Luis Álvaro de Oliveira Ribeiro resigned from the presidency of the club due to health problems, and Odílio Rodrigues (the former vice-president) assumed the position until the end of his term.

Players

Squad information

Source: SantosFC.com.br (for appearances and goals), Wikipedia players' articles (for international appearances and goals), FPF (for contracts)

Reserves

Starting XI

4–3–3 Formation

According to the most recent line-ups.

<div style="position: relative;">

Appearances and goals

Last updated: 8 December 2014
Source: Match reports in Competitive matches, Soccerway, Campeonato Brasileiro, Campeonato Paulista, Copa do Brasil

Goalscorers

Last updated: 8 December 2014
Source: Match reports in Competitive matches

Disciplinary record

As of 8 December 2014
Source: Campeonato Brasileiro, Campeonato Paulista, Copa do Brasil
 = Number of bookings;  = Number of sending offs after a second yellow card;  = Number of sending offs by a direct red card.

Suspensions served

Injuries

Squad number changes

Club

Coaching staff

Other staff

Club officials

Kit

Source: Home Ayaw  Third

Official sponsorship

 Corr Plastik
 CNA Idiomas
 Unicef
Huawei

Transfers

Transfers in

Total spending:  R$46,000,000

Loans in

Transfers out

Total gaining:  R$ 33,500,000

Loans out

Contracts

Competitions

Overall

Detailed overall summary

{| class="wikitable" style="text-align: center"
|-
!
!Total
! Home
! Away
|-
|align=left| Games played          || 68 || 35 || 33
|-
|align=left| Games won             || 36 || 25 || 11
|-
|align=left| Games drawn           || 13 || 4 || 9
|-
|align=left| Games lost            || 19 || 6 || 13
|-
|align=left| Biggest win           || 5–0 v Bragantino5–0 v Botafogo || 5–0 v Bragantino5–0 v Botafogo || 5–2 v Mogi Mirim
|-
|align=left| Biggest loss          || 1–4 v Penapolense0–3 v Cruzeiro0–3 v Criciúma || 1–2 v Atlético Mineiro1–2 v Internacional || 1–4 v Penapolense0–3 v Cruzeiro0–3 v Criciúma
|-
|align=left| Clean sheets          || 27 || 17 || 10
|-
|align=left| Goals scored          || 114 || 76 || 38
|-
|align=left| Goals conceded        || 65 || 24 || 41
|-
|align=left| Goal difference       || +49 || +52 || -3
|-
|-
|-
|align=left| Yellow cards         || 150 || 69 || 81
|-
|align=left| Red cards       || 7 || 3 || 4
|-
|align=left| Most appearances     || align=center| Aranha (58)Cicinho (58) ||align=center| Aranha (31)Arouca (31)Gabriel (31) ||Cicinho (29)
|-
|align=left| Top scorer   || align=center| Gabriel (21)||align=center| Gabriel (15)||align=center| Gabriel (6)
|-
|align=left|Worst discipline      || align=center| Cicinho  (16)  (2) ||align=center|David Braz  (10)||align=center| Cicinho  (10)  (1)
|-
|align=left| Points               || 121/204 (%) || 79/105 (%) || 42/99 (%)
|-
|align=left| Winning rate         || (%) || (%) || (%)
|-

Campeonato Brasileiro

Results summary

Results by round

League table

Matches

Source:

Copa do Brasil

First round

Second round

Third round

Round of 16

Quarter-finals

Semi-finals

Campeonato Paulista

Results summary

Group stage

Results by round

Matches

Knockout stage

Quarter-final

Semi-final

Finals

References

External links
Official Site 
Official Youtube Channel 

2014
Santos F.C.